in chemistry, sulfoxidation refers to two distinct reactions. 

In one meaning, sulfoxidation refers to the reaction of alkanes with a mixture of sulfur dioxide and oxygen.  This reaction is employed industrially to produce alkyl sulfonic acids, which are used as surfactants.  The reaction requires UV-radiation.
RH + SO2 + 1/2 O2 -> RSO3H
The reaction favors secondary positions in accord with its free-radical mechanism.  Mixtures are produced.  Semiconductor-sensitized variants have been reported.

Sulfoxidation can also refer to the oxygenation of a thioether to a sulfoxide.
R2S + O -> R2SO
A typical source of "O" is hydrogen peroxide.

References

 
 
Sulfoxides